The Pavlič Pass, Paulitsch Pass or Paulitsch Saddle or just Pavlič (elevation 1338 m) is a mountain pass that connects the Slovenian municipality of Solčava in the historical region of Lower Styria with the Austrian state of Carinthia.

The Seeberg highway (B 82) runs from the Austrian side through the scenic village of Bad Eisenkappel up to the border crossing Seebergsattel. Nine kilometres after Bad Eisenkappel, a road to Paulitschsattel bears left off the B 82. A short descent is followed by a very steep 6 km climb and then 1 km of undulating road to the pass and border crossing. On the Slovenian side, the ascent starts at the beginning of the scenic Logar Valley and is 7 km long.

See also
 List of highest paved roads in Europe
 List of mountain passes

References

See also
Styria
Carinthia (province)

Mountain passes of Slovenia
Mountain passes of Carinthia (state)
Mountain passes of the Alps
Austria–Slovenia border crossings
Kamnik–Savinja Alps